Orodesma is a genus of moths in the family Erebidae.

Species
 Orodesma ameria (Druce, 1890)
 Orodesma apicina Herrich-Schäffer, 1868
 Orodesma cladonia (Felder & Rogenhofer, 1874)
 Orodesma demepa (Dyar, 1914)
 Orodesma elipha (Schaus, 1940)
 Orodesma fearni (Schaus, 1911)
 Orodesma monoflex (Dyar, 1924)
 Orodesma peratopis (Hampson, 1924)
 Orodesma pulverosa (Schaus, 1911)
 Orodesma schausi (Druce, 1890)

References
 
 
 

Melipotini
Moth genera